The William H. Hull House is a historic house located at 1517 Walnut St. in Murphysboro, Illinois. The house was built in 1887 for William H. Hull, a significant local businessman and politician. The house is designed in an asymmetrical Italianate pattern. The front facade of the house features a three-sided projecting bay topped by a half-hipped roof. The main entrance is located to the side of the bay in a porch supported by chamfered columns with decorative brackets. The cornice of the house features a patterned molding divided by ornamental brackets. The house's roof has a cross-hipped design with flared eaves.

The house was added to the National Register of Historic Places on February 1, 2006.

References

Houses on the National Register of Historic Places in Illinois
Italianate architecture in Illinois
Houses completed in 1887
Houses in Jackson County, Illinois
National Register of Historic Places in Jackson County, Illinois